Julien Boullery (4 October 1886 – 21 October 1971) was a French sprinter. He competed in the men's 100 metres at the 1912 Summer Olympics.

References

1886 births
1971 deaths
Athletes (track and field) at the 1912 Summer Olympics
French male sprinters
Olympic athletes of France
Place of birth missing